General elections were held in Costa Rica on 2 December 1923. Ricardo Jiménez Oreamuno of the Republican Party won the presidential election, whilst the party also won the parliamentary election, in which they received 51.5% of the vote. Voter turnout was 70.5% in the presidential election and 83.9% in the parliamentary election.

Background
The newly founded Agricultural Party chooses its presidential nominee at a convention held at the Teatro El Trébol between the aristocrat Alberto Echandi Montero and the ex-president Rafael Yglesias Castro, receiving 231 and 123 votes respectively, although Yglesias requested the attendees to support Echandi then thought about retiring from politics (he died a year later).

In the Republican Party the grassroots base is determined to convince former President Ricardo Jimenez Oreamuno to accept the candidacy, but he was reluctant. Once convinced, he said "You do not go with me, I go with you" and "... if the devil takes me, I am in good company".

The other new party that emerges is the Reformist Party of ex-priest and military Jorge Volio, and which is considered the first "social" political party in Costa Rica, since it was the first one that really inserted itself among and from the popular classes, inspired by Volio's Christian socialism.

Campaign
Both the republicans and the reformists concentrated their batteries against the candidacy of Echandi, whom they considered representative of the most privileged classes, as well as accusing him of "tinoquista". Echandi, meanwhile, focused on attacking Volio who he accused of being a puppet of Jiménez and that his party had been founded as an electoral trap for the Republicans, also questioned the constitutionality of Volio's candidacy since the Constitution prohibited Catholic priests from being presidents (even though Volio had already renounced his priesthood). Due to Volio's guerrilla past and the abandonment of his habits, he was compared to Judas, Martin Luther and Pancho Villa.

Jiménez, on the other hand, did not attack the reformists, on the contrary he affirmed: "The  is the adversary, because the reformists do not conceptualize them as such. Both parties, the Republican and the Reformist, are planets that revolve around the same sun of ideals. (...) If the opinion favors us we will say the republicans; we have won. If the opinion is inclined to the side of the reformists we can say that the Republicans have not lost."

Jiménez would obtain 46% of the votes, Echandi 29% and Volio 20% (a rather surprising result given that it was a party with less than a year of foundation). Because no candidate obtained enough votes to win in the first round (50%) it was up to the Constitutional Congress (parliament) to choose the president.

Aftermath
At that time, half of the Congress was maintained for two more years and the other half was renewed. The Republican Party obtained 11 new deputies, the Agricultural obtained eight and the Reformists four, that added to those already in functions (including Jiménez and Volio) would be; 20 Agricultural deputies, 18 Republicans and 5 Reformists for a total of 43. It was clear that the decisive vote would be from the Reformists because the Agriculturalists, even with a majority, did not have enough votes to elect the president alone.

During the counting of votes the Reformist Lorenzo Cambronero organized a popular uprising in San Ramón, which was stifled by the government without major impact, but which caused the cancellation of several polling stations that favored the echandismo, which caused it to lose two deputies that were to give to the Republican and the Reformist, and for which the echandistas accused of electoral fraud.

After exhaustive negotiations finally Republicans and Reformists reached an agreement, the presidency for Jiménez and vice president for Volio, in addition to the portfolios of Education and Development for Reformist and support for several of their programmatic proposals. The Agriculturalists tried to break the quorum but the presidency of a single agricultural deputy, Gerardo Zúñiga Montúfar, prevented it. Montúfar affirmed that it was his constitutional duty to attend. Jiménez was elected as expected with the combined votes of the Republican and Reformist caucuses, since Echandi only won one vote (Montúfar's) . When the followers of Echandi instigated him to reject the results and organize a revolt, Echandi replied:

Results

President

By province

Appointment of Ricardo Jiménez Oreamuno

Parliament

References

1923 elections in Central America
1923 in Costa Rica
Elections in Costa Rica